Lady Sarah Wilson DStJ RRC (born Lady Sarah Isabella Augusta Spencer-Churchill; 4 July 1865 – 22 October 1929) became one of the first woman war correspondents in 1899, when she was recruited by Alfred Harmsworth to cover the Siege of Mafeking for the Daily Mail during the Second Boer War.

Family
Born on 4 July 1865 at Blenheim Palace, Woodstock, Oxfordshire, Lady Sarah Spencer-Churchill was the youngest of the eleven children of John Spencer-Churchill, 7th Duke of Marlborough (1822–1883), and his wife, the former Lady Frances Anne Emily Vane (1822–1899), daughter of the 3rd Marquess of Londonderry. Her eldest brother was George Charles Spencer-Churchill, 8th Duke of Marlborough (1844–1892), and another brother was Lord Randolph Churchill (1849–1895), father of the Prime Minister Winston Churchill (1874–1965), who also worked as a war correspondent during the Boer War, for The Morning Post. Anne, Duchess of Roxburghe (1854–1923), was her elder sister.

On 21 November 1891, she married Gordon Chesney Wilson, MVO, (3 August 1865 – 6 November 1914), of the Royal Horse Guards, son of Jennie Campbell and Sir Samuel Wilson, MP. Her Oxford-educated husband, who had been born in Wimmera, Victoria, Australia, was killed in action on 6 November 1914, at the First Battle of Ypres. They had one son, Randolph Gordon Wilson (1893–1956).

Siege of Mafeking correspondent
The Daily Mail newspaper recruited Lady Sarah after one of its correspondents, Ralph Hellawell, was arrested by the Boers as he tried to get out of the besieged town of Mafeking to send his dispatch. She was in the right place at the right time to step into the journalistic breach, having moved to Mafeking with her husband, Captain Gordon Chesney Wilson, at the start of the war, where he was aide-de-camp to Col. Robert Baden-Powell, the commanding officer at Mafeking. Baden-Powell asked her to leave Mafeking for her own safety after the Boers threatened to storm the British garrison. This she duly did, and set off on a madcap adventure in the company of her maid, travelling through the South African countryside. Eventually, she was captured by the Boers and returned to the town in exchange for a horse thief being held there.

When she re-entered Mafeking, she found it had not been attacked as predicted. During her stay in the city, she also helped with nursing in a convalescent hospital, and was slightly wounded when it was shelled by Boer forces in late January 1900.

On 26 March 1900, toward the end of the siege, she wrote:

 

Although death and destruction surrounded her, the Mail’s fledgling war correspondent preferred not to dwell too much on the horrors of the siege. She described cycling events held on Sundays and the town’s celebration of Colonel Baden-Powell’s birthday, which was declared a holiday. Despite these cheery events, dwindling food supplies became a constant theme in the stories she sent back to the Mail and the situation seemed hopeless when the garrison was hit by an outbreak of malarial typhoid. In this weakened state the Boers managed to penetrate the outskirts of the town, but the British stood firm and repelled the assault.

The siege finally ended after 217 days, when the Royal Horse and Canadian Artillery galloped into Mafeking on 17 May 1900. Only a few people standing in a dusty road, singing "Rule, Britannia!", were there to greet their saviours. But in London it was a different scene as more than 20,000 people turned out in the streets to celebrate the relief of Mafeking.

Later life

In May 1901, Wilson was invested as a Dame of Grace of The Most Venerable Order of the Hospital of Saint John of Jerusalem (DStJ), and in December the same year King Edward VII personally conferred on her the decoration of the Royal Red Cross (RRC) for her services in Mafeking.

She returned to South Africa with her sister Countess Howe from September to November 1902. The Countess (as Lady Georgina Curzon) had throughout the war been involved with raising money for the Imperial Yeomanry Hospital.

At the outbreak of the First World War Lady Sarah went to France and was running a hospital for injured soldiers in Boulogne when she received the news of her husband's death at Klein Zillebeke. Gordon's brother Herbert who served in the same regiment sent Gordon’s personal effects to Lady Sarah. In Gordon’s writing case, she found a newspaper cutting containing lines from the 17th-century gravestone of James Handley. It reads:

‘This world is a city full of crooked streets

Death is a market place where all men meet.

If life were merchandise that men could buy

Rich men would ever live and poor men die”

The lines are an adaptation from William Shakespeare's last play the Two Noble Kinsmen. Lady Sarah chose the lines “Life is a city of crooked streets Death the market place where all men meet” for Gordon Wilson's headstone.

Notes and references

Notes

Citations

 S. J. Taylor (1996). The Great Outsiders: Northcliffe, Rothermere and the Daily Mail. Weidenfeld & Nicolson. .

External links
 
 
 
 
 Portrait of Lady Sarah Isabella Augusta Wilson (1865-1929), daughter of 7th Duke of Marlborough at the National Portrait Gallery
 South African Memories

1865 births
1929 deaths
British war correspondents
Daily Mail journalists
Dames of Grace of the Order of St John
Daughters of British dukes
People of the Second Boer War
Sarah Wilson
Women war correspondents
Women in 19th-century warfare
Women in war 1900–1945
Members of the Royal Red Cross